Demi Vance (born 2 May 1991) is a Northern Irish footballer who most recently played as a midfielder for Leicester City in the WSL, and has appeared for the Northern Ireland women's national team.

Career
Vance has been capped for the Northern Ireland national team, appearing for the team during the 2019 FIFA Women's World Cup qualifying cycle.

References

External links
 
 
 

1991 births
Living people
Women's association footballers from Northern Ireland
Northern Ireland women's international footballers
Women's association football midfielders
Rangers W.F.C. players
Glentoran W.F.C. players
UEFA Women's Euro 2022 players